The Secret Saturdays is an animated television series that aired on Cartoon Network in most countries and on Teletoon in Canada. The episodes are directed by Scott Jeralds and produced by PorchLight Entertainment. The series debuted on Cartoon Network on October 3, 2008.

The series concentrates on the adventures of the Saturdays, a family of cryptozoologists who work to keep the truth about cryptids from getting out in order to protect the human race and the creatures themselves. The Saturdays travel the Earth searching for cryptids to study and battling twisted villains like the megalomaniac V.V. Argost. The series is influenced by the style of 1960s-era Hanna-Barbera action series (such as Jonny Quest) and is combined with creator Jay Stephens's own personal interest in cryptozoology.

The first season has 26 episodes and is focused primarily on the Saturdays' search for an ancient Sumerian cryptid called Kur, who has the power to control an army of cryptids. At the end of the season finale, it was revealed that Kur was none other than Zak Saturday, a fact of which not even Zak was aware. On November 7, 2009, a second season containing 10 episodes aired to follow up on the cliffhanger ending. It featured a self-contained story arc focused on Zak and his family dealing with the revelation of Zak being Kur and the consequences of that knowledge. The series ended on January 30, 2010. Contrary to what many people believe, there are only two seasons.

Series overview

Episodes

Season 1 (2008–09)

Season 2 (2009–10)

The Secret Saturdays/Ben 10 crossover

See also
 List of The Secret Saturdays characters

References

Lists of American children's animated television series episodes
Lists of Cartoon Network television series episodes
The Secret Saturdays
2000s television-related lists
2010s television-related lists